The Washougal River is a  tributary of the Columbia River in the U.S. state of Washington. Its headwaters and upper  are in Skamania County in the Gifford Pinchot National Forest, and its lower  are in Clark County. The river, which meets the Columbia near the cities of Washougal and Camas, is a popular stream for fishing, swimming, and boating.

Explorers Meriwether Lewis and William Clark referred to the Washougal River as the "Seal River." The name Washougal comes from the Cascades Chinook placename [wasiixwal] or [wasuxal], meaning "rushing water".

Watershed
The Washougal River drains  of land that is largely forested, especially in its upper reaches in the Cascade Range and its foothills. Of the total,  are in Skamania County, and the remaining  are in Clark County.  Small farms and rural homes are found along the lower part of the basin, and two small Clark County cities, Camas and Washougal, are at the river mouth. About 63 percent of the watershed is forested; 21 percent is devoted to fields, pastures, bare earth, and shrubland, and 16 percent is developed or cleared for development.

The water quality of surface streams in the basin is rated "excellent" to "good", with a few exceptions. State and county officials monitor the lower reaches of the river for signs of trouble such as harmful bacteria, elevated water temperatures, and bank erosion related to forest clearing and other development. Two of the river's tributaries, Jones Creek and Boulder Creek, supply drinking water to Camas.

Recreation
The Washougal River, which has no dams, has significant fisheries. The main stem and some of the tributaries support populations of Chinook, chum, and Coho salmon, steelhead, and coastal cutthroat trout. Dougan Falls,  from the mouth, blocks most fish migration beyond the waterfall. The Washougal River Greenway in Camas has fishing access, a short walking trail, a boat launch, and picnic sites. Much of the recreation access, including Dougan Falls, now requires a Discover Pass, Washington state's recreation fee pass. A separate parking pass is required for Naked Falls, which is on private land and was closed to the public for several years but has now reopened.

A series of waterfalls, some of them associated with swimming holes, are found along the main stream. From lowermost to uppermost, the named falls include Salmon, Dougan, Naked, Reeder, Stebbins Creek, and Docs Drop.

Whitewater enthusiasts run parts of the Washougal River and some of its tributaries. The runs include many stretches rated 4, 5, or 5+ on the International Scale of River Difficulty.

See also
List of rivers of Washington
List of tributaries of the Columbia River

References

Rivers of Washington (state)
Rivers of Clark County, Washington
Rivers of Skamania County, Washington
Tributaries of the Columbia River